The 20 km of Brussels is a 20.1 km running race that has been held each year in Brussels since 1980, usually in May. It used to have a maximum number of 25,000 entries, which were normally sold out quite quickly after places go on sale in March, but in 2010 a staggered start-time approach led to an increased maximum number of entries of 40,000.

The race is a major event in Brussels, with a large turnout of supporters. The course is quite challenging, particularly due to the gentle, long overall climb and several tunnels between kilometer three and seven as well as the long and steep climb on Avenue de Tervueren towards the end of the race. 

The exact course distance has varied over time. The 2014 course officially covers 20.1 km. The course often did not cover a complete 20 km circuit in its early history. The 2000 race was significantly shorter than the full distance and both the men's and women's winners finished the race more than three minutes ahead of the world records at the time.

Past winners
KEY: 
Italics = Short course

See also
Brussels Marathon

References

External links
 Official website
 20 km of Brussels on Google Maps
 Photos

20K runs
Recurring sporting events established in 1980
Sport in Brussels
Athletics competitions in Belgium
1980 establishments in Belgium
Annual events in Brussels
Annual sporting events in Belgium
Spring (season) events in Belgium